The Armstrong Tunnel in Pittsburgh, Pennsylvania, connects Second Avenue at the South Tenth Street Bridge, under the Bluff where Duquesne University is located, to Forbes Avenue between Boyd Street and Chatham Square.

Construction
The tunnel was constructed between 1926 and 1927. The chief engineer was Vernon R. Covell of the Allegheny County Public Works Department. The tunnel portals were designed by a city architect, Stanley L. Roush, who is also noted for the Smithfield Street Bridge portals, the Pittsburgh City-County Building, the Corliss Tunnel, and many other municipal projects.

Characteristics
The tunnel itself is characterized by twin bores of horseshoe cross-section, and bends halfway through. It also has a pedestrian walkway on the western side. Pghbridges.com reports that since the air draft flows toward the river, bicyclists are able to travel through the tunnel in that direction "with little or no effort."

A legend mentioned by the site involves a notion that the bend in the tunnel was a mistake, and whoever was responsible committed suicide in shame. Chief engineer Covell did not kill himself, invalidating this legend. Author Bruce S. Cridlebaugh suspects the bend was related to mines or other geological factors, property rights (including Duquesne University), or alignments with existing or proposed roads.

Since August 1987 the tunnels have provided cellular phone reception.

Name
The tunnels were named in honor of Joseph G. Armstrong, County Director of Public Works. Most of the bridges over the Pittsburgh's three rivers were replaced between 1910 and 1940, years which included Mr. Armstrong's terms as Mayor of Pittsburgh and Allegheny County Commissioner.

References

External links

Tunnels in Pittsburgh
Duquesne University
Road tunnels on the National Register of Historic Places
Transportation buildings and structures on the National Register of Historic Places in Pennsylvania
Tunnels completed in 1926
Pittsburgh History & Landmarks Foundation Historic Landmarks
1926 establishments in Pennsylvania
Road tunnels in Pennsylvania
National Register of Historic Places in Pittsburgh